Seyed Ahmad Mohammadi Ghadikalaei (born 11 January 1992 in Qaem Shahr) is an Iranian wrestler who won the silver medal at the 2014 World Championships.

References

External links
Profile on Sports-Reference Website

Iranian male sport wrestlers
Living people
People from Qaem Shahr
World Wrestling Championships medalists
1992 births
Asian Wrestling Championships medalists
Sportspeople from Mazandaran province
21st-century Iranian people
20th-century Iranian people